Tellapadu (pronounced "Tellabadu") is a village of Doddavaram Panchayathi in Maddipadu Mandal of Prakasam District in the southern Indian state of Andhra Pradesh.

It is a part of the Bapatla (SC) parliamentary and Santhanuthalapadu (SC) assembly constituency. It was previously a part of the Addanki assembly constituency.

Geography
It lies to the South-South West of the reservoir of the River Gundlakamma.

Public Institutions
Tellapadu has a Zilla Parishad High School named after Paruchuri Narasimhaiah, and a sub-post office. The school's golden jubilee celebrations were celebrated on 21 April 2013, and was well covered by Telugu media.

Notable people
Several landlords, eminent industrialists, senior public/private sector employees hail from here including:

1) (Late) Mallipeddi Venkatasubbaiah & Ramaswamy Chowdary, and later the former's sons, in their prime, were the richest people/zamindars of the village. Such was their wealth that people used to fight to stake claim to their cattle's dung, whence they were passing through the village. A bust of (Late) Mallipeddi Pitchaiah was unveiled during the recent high school golden jubilee celebrations for his benevolent contribution of 6 acres of land towards the school.

2) (Late) Velagapudi Ramakrishna(founder KCP group, former ICS officer). Tellapadu was the birthplace of his father (original surname: Katragadda) who was then adopted by close relatives in Bellamvaripalem, near Repalle (Guntur district), Andhra Pradesh, India.

3) (Late) Panda Punnaiah (whose mother hails from here) was chairman, Beardsell Ltd. and also on the boards of Nava Bharat Ventures Ltd. (formerly Nava Bharat Ferro Alloys) and Prakasam Sugar Complex Ltd.

Composition
The village also includes a large number of migrants from the former Repalle Taluk in Guntur District.
The caste composition of the main village is mainly by members of the Kamma caste, all Pedda Kammas, a large chunk of whom have migrated to urban areas (particularly Hyderabad, Bangalore, Guntur and the US). Other castes include Brahmins and Vaishyas; professional castes like washermen, barbers, milkmen; dalits and others. The latter two-thirds have their own quarters towards the village's boundary.

External links
 Paruchuri Narasimhaiah ZP high school golden jubilee celebrations video Part1
 Paruchuri Narasimhaiah ZP high school golden jubilee celebrations video Part2

References

Villages in Prakasam district